Self Made Lady is a 1932 British drama film directed by George King and starring Heather Angel, Henry Wilcoxon and Amy Veness. It marked the screen debut of Louis Hayward who later became a star in Hollywood. The film was made at the Nettlefold Studios in Walton-on-Thames. Cut down from its original running time of 77 minutes, it was distributed as a second feature by United Artists to allow the company to fulfill its quota requirement.

Cast
 Heather Angel as Sookey  
 Henry Wilcoxon as Bert Taverner  
 Amy Veness as Old Sookey  
 A. Bromley Davenport as Duke of Alchester  
 Louis Hayward as Paul Geneste  
 Charles Cullum as Lord Max Mariven  
 Ronald Ritchie as Alf Naylor  
 Doris Gilmore as Claudine  
 Harry Adnes as Roberts  
 Oriel Ross as Lady Poppy  
 Lola Duncan Mrs. Stoach  
 Violet Hopson as Annie 
 Charles Callum

References

Bibliography
 Low, Rachael. Filmmaking in 1930s Britain. George Allen & Unwin, 1985.
 Wood, Linda. British Films, 1927-1939. British Film Institute, 1986.

External links

1932 films
British drama films
1932 drama films
Films directed by George King
Films shot at Nettlefold Studios
Quota quickies
United Artists films
British black-and-white films
1930s English-language films
1930s British films